Jettison is the third album by Chicago punk band Naked Raygun, released on Caroline Records in 1988.

Track listing
All songs written by Naked Raygun, except for "Suspect Device" by Stiff Little Fingers.

Personnel
Naked Raygun
John Haggerty – guitar, saxophone
Pierre Kezdy – bass guitar
Jeff Pezzati – vocals
Eric Spicer – drums
Additional musicians and production
Grant Austin – engineering
Karen Bemis – photography
John Bergin – illustrations
Iain Burgess – production, recording
Cosaro Productions – art direction
Naked Raygun – production
Timothy R. Powell – recording
Larry Sturm – production
Bryan Willette – illustrations

References

1988 albums
Albums produced by Iain Burgess
Caroline Records albums
Naked Raygun albums